The United Irishman was a nationalist weekly newspaper published by John Mitchel in Dublin in 1848. It was suppressed by the British Government the same year.

History
From 1845, John Mitchel had been invited by Charles Gavan Duffy, co-founder and first editor of The Nation (a paper supporting Daniel O'Connell's Repeal Association) to write for that paper. He became part of the Young Ireland movement and after the schism in the Repeal Association, he formed the Irish Confederation, with Thomas Reilly, William O'Brien and led by Thomas Meagher. Dissatisfied with his lot at The Nation, he favoured a more "vigorous policy against the English government" and resigned in 1847. From his office at 12 Trinity Street, Dublin, he printed and published the first issue of the United Irishman on 12 February 1848. Other Young Ireland contributors included John Martin, Thomas Devin Reilly and the nationalist Roman Catholic priest, John Kenyon. The contents included articles and letters citing public grievances (which were discussed in Parliament), promoting Irish independence, and reporting the general European unrest of the time, including the Chartist movement in Great Britain.

On 24 February, Edward Smith-Stanley, then known as Lord Stanley, highlighted the United Irishman in the House of Lords and quoted Mitchel's published "letter" to the Earl of Clarendon, George Villiers, which he claimed fomented sedition. On 21 March, O'Brien and Meagher were charged with making seditious speeches and Mitchel was charged with publishing three seditious articles in the United Irishman. Mitchel's words - saying that he was guilty of sedition and wanting to overthrow the Government - were quoted by George Grey in the first reading of the Crown and Government Security Bill in House of Commons on 7 April. An article by Gavan Duffy in The Nation was quoted in the same speech as being of seditious nature.

Mitchel was finally arrested. In the U.K. Parliament, a new crime of treason felony had been proposed and royal assent granted in April. Mitchel was duly charged with this crime. In the Commission Court on 22 May, after the Clerk of the Crown queried the foreman of the jury who said the bill against Mitchel was for "Sedition". The foreman replied, to laughter, "For treason, felony or whatever it is - I know not." On Friday, 26 May, Mitchel was found guilty and was the following day sentenced to transportation for 14 years to Van Diemen's Land.

Sixteen issues of the United Irishman had been printed. The last was on 27 May 1848 and covered at length Mitchel's court case and conviction. It included Mitchel's final contribution, penned in Newgate Prison. After that issue, the Government seized the printing materials and suppressed further publication of the paper. In June, Martin printed and published The Irish Felon, a successor newspaper from the same Dublin office, honouring subscriptions to its predecessor. Martin suffered the same fate as Mitchel on 18 August.

References

Defunct newspapers published in Ireland
Publications established in 1848
Defunct weekly newspapers
Young Ireland
1848 disestablishments in Ireland
Irish republican newspapers